The Aripuanã Sustainable Development Reserve is a sustainable development reserve in the state of Amazonas, Brazil.

Location

The Aripuanã Sustainable Development Reserve is in the Apuí municipality of Amazonas.
The reserve lies on either side of the Aripuanã River.
It is bounded to the south by the border with the state of Mato Grosso. 
To the east of the Aripuanã River it adjoins the Igarapés do Juruena State Park in Mato Grosso.
To the east it adjoins the Sucunduri State Forest.
To the west it adjoins the Aripuanã State Forest.

History

The Aripuanã Sustainable Development Reserve was created by Amazonas state governor decree 24811 of 21 January 2005.
The objectives included preserving nature and the conditions needed to preserve and improve the livelihoods, quality of life and use of natural resources of the traditional populations, and preserving and improving knowledge and environmental management techniques of the traditional populations.

Conservation

The reserve is an integral part of the Apuí Mosaic, which totals  in area and contains the Guariba and Sucunduri State Parks; Bararati and Aripuanã sustainable development reserves; Guariba Extractive Reserve; and Sucunduri, Aripuana, Apuí and Manicoré state forests.
The conservation unit is supported by the Amazon Region Protected Areas Program.

Notes

Sources

2005 establishments in Brazil
Sustainable development reserves of Brazil
Protected areas of Amazonas (Brazilian state)